TCID may also stand for "Tissue Culture Infectious Dose." or "4,5,6,7-Tetrachloro-1H-indene-1,3(2H)-dione"

The Truckee–Carson Irrigation District (TCID) is a political subdivision of the State of Nevada, which operates dams at Lake Tahoe, diversion dams on the Truckee River in Washoe County, and the Lake Lahontan reservoir.  

The excess irrigation water eventually drains into the endorheic Lake Lahontan Basin.

Endangered species
Diversion of water by the TCID from the Truckee River has caused a reduction in the level of natural Pyramid Lake, resulting in the endemic species of fish that live in it becoming endangered species.  

In the mid-1980s the United States Environmental Protection Agency initiated development of the DSSAM Model to analyze effects of variable Truckee River flow rates and water quality upon these endangered fish species.

See also
 Derby Dam
 Newlands Reclamation Act

References

External links

Water in Nevada
Historic American Engineering Record in Nevada
Irrigation Districts of the United States
Irrigation projects
Local government in Nevada
Agriculture in Nevada
Churchill County, Nevada
Lyon County, Nevada
Washoe County, Nevada